Dr. Meredith Wallace Kazer is a professor of nursing and dean of the Marion Peckham Egan School of Nursing and Health Studies at Fairfield University.  Wallace was an associate professor of nursing at the Yale University School of Nursing in New Haven, Connecticut.

Kazer co-edited "Prostate Cancer: Nursing Assessment, Management, and Care," (Springer Publishing Co. 2002) with Lorrie L. Powel, Ph.D., RN, a research health scientist at Boston University School of Public Health. The American Journal of Nursing awarded the book one of its prestigious book awards.

Dr. Kazer earned a Bachelor of Science of Nursing from Boston University, a Master of Science of Nursing from Yale University and a Ph.D. of Nursing Research and Theory Development from New York University.

References

External links
YSN Profile

Living people
Yale School of Nursing alumni
New York University alumni
Boston University School of Nursing alumni
Fairfield University faculty
American nurses
American women nurses
Year of birth missing (living people)